Osleni Guerrero Velazco (born 18 October 1989) is a Cuban badminton player. He is the first Cuban badminton player to win a medal in the Pan American Games. Guerrero also competed at the 2016 Summer Olympics.

Career 
Guerrero, born in Havana, started competing in badminton in 2000, and joined the national team in 2005. As a junior player he won the under-19 category at the 2007 Pan Am Junior Badminton Championships held at Puerto Vallarta, Mexico where he beat first seed Howard Shu of the USA, 21–13, 21–10 in the final.

Guerrero won a bronze medal in the men's singles event at the 2015 Pan Am Games, losing the semi-final to Canadian Andrew D'Souza. In the 2011 Pan American Games he made history, reaching the final and a silver [an Am Games medal for Cuba at badminton for the first time. He eventually lost that final to first seeded Kevin Cordón of Guatemala with 13–21, 19–21.

Guerrero competed in 2014 and 2015 BWF World Championships. He is a member of the Cuban national badminton team since 2005. He twice won the continental Pan American Badminton Championship. First in 2013 at Santo Domingo, beating first seeded American Sattawat Pongnairat 17–21, 21–6, 21–16 in a close 51 minutes final. In 2014 at Markham venue, he successfully defended his Pan American badminton title, this time beating another American Bjorn Seguin in another close fought final of 58 minutes with 19–21, 21–14, and 21–13. Guerrero won many events in the Pan American Badminton circuit.

At the 2016 Rio Olympics, Guerrero played the men's singles event in Group J with Tommy Sugiarto of Indonesia, and Howard Shu of United States. He placed second in the group standing after won a match to Shu, but lost to Sugiarto. He won the silver medal at the 2017 Pan Am Championships defeated by the Brazilian Ygor Coelho de Oliveira in the final.

In 2018, he won four medals at the Central American and Caribbean Games, a gold medal in the mixed doubles, also three silver medals in the men's singles, doubles, and team events.

In 2019, he reached the finals at the Pan Am Championships in two different events, won a gold medal in the men's singles event.

Achievements

Pan American Games 
Men's singles

Men's doubles

Pan Am Championships 
Men's singles

Men's doubles

Central American and Caribbean Games 
Men's singles

Men's doubles

Mixed doubles

Pan Am Junior Championships 
Boys' singles

BWF International Challenge/Series (33 titles, 17 runners-up) 
Men's singles

Men's doubles

Mixed doubles

  BWF International Challenge tournament
  BWF International Series tournament
  BWF Future Series tournament

References

External links 
 
 

1989 births
Living people
Sportspeople from Havana
Cuban male badminton players
Badminton players at the 2016 Summer Olympics
Olympic badminton players of Cuba
Badminton players at the 2007 Pan American Games
Badminton players at the 2011 Pan American Games
Badminton players at the 2015 Pan American Games
Badminton players at the 2019 Pan American Games
Pan American Games silver medalists for Cuba
Pan American Games bronze medalists for Cuba
Pan American Games medalists in badminton
Medalists at the 2011 Pan American Games
Medalists at the 2015 Pan American Games
Medalists at the 2019 Pan American Games
Competitors at the 2014 Central American and Caribbean Games
Competitors at the 2018 Central American and Caribbean Games
Central American and Caribbean Games gold medalists for Cuba
Central American and Caribbean Games silver medalists for Cuba
Central American and Caribbean Games bronze medalists for Cuba
Central American and Caribbean Games medalists in badminton
21st-century Cuban people